Pablo Albano (born 11 April 1967) is a former professional tennis player from Argentina.  

Albano enjoyed most of his tennis success while playing doubles. During his career, he won 9 doubles titles. He achieved a career-high doubles ranking of World No. 25 in 1997.

Career finals

Doubles (9 wins– 9 losses)

External links
 
 

Argentine male tennis players
Tennis players from Buenos Aires
Living people
1967 births
Pan American Games medalists in tennis
Pan American Games silver medalists for Argentina
Tennis players at the 1987 Pan American Games